Lessons in Chocolate is a 2007 Italian romantic comedy film directed by Claudio Cupellini.

Cast
Luca Argentero as Mattia Cavedoni
Violante Placido as Cecilia Ferri
Neri Marcorè as Corrado
Hassani Shapi as Kamal
Monica Scattini as Letizia
Francesco Pannofino as Luigi
Vito as Osvaldo
Josefia Forlì as Corrado Mineo
Matteo Oleotto as Milo
Rolando Ravello as the presenter
Ivano Marescotti as Giancarlo Ugolini
Salami Bahija as Shamira

References

External links

2007 films
Films directed by Claudio Cupellini
2000s Italian-language films
2007 romantic comedy films
Italian romantic comedy films
Cooking films
Films about chocolate
Films about chefs
Films set in Umbria
2000s Italian films